Montgomery County Airport  is a public use airport located in Star, a city in Montgomery County, North Carolina, United States. It is owned and operated by Montgomery County.

Facilities and aircraft 
It has one asphalt paved runway designated 3/21 which measures 4,002 by 75 feet (1,220 x 23 m).

For the 12-month period ending July 3, 2022, the airport had 4,800 aircraft operations, an average of 13 per day: about 58% general aviation and 42% military. At that time there were 10 aircraft based at this airport, all single-engine.

References

External links 
 Aerial photo as of 28 February 1999 from USGS The National Map
 

Airports in North Carolina
Transportation in Montgomery County, North Carolina
Buildings and structures in Montgomery County, North Carolina